Astrothelium flavomaculatum is a species of corticolous (bark-dwelling), crustose lichen in the family Trypetheliaceae. Found in Guyana, Venezuela, and Ecuador, it was formally described as a new species in 2016 by Dutch lichenologist André Aptroot. It is green with a thin orange pruina. Its ascospores are hyaline, ellipsoid in shape, and muriform (i.e. divided into internal chambers by transverse and longitudinal septa), with dimensions of 50–75 by 12–25 µm. It is somewhat similar in appearance to Astrothelium graphicum , but that species has somewhat smaller ascospores with lengths up to 66 µm.

References

flavomaculatum
Lichen species
Lichens described in 2016
Lichens of Ecuador
Lichens of Guyana
Lichens of Venezuela
Taxa named by André Aptroot